3-Hydroxyamphetamine (INN; trade names Pressionorm, Gepefrine, and Wintonin), also known as meta-hydroxyamphetamine, and α-methyl-meta-tyramine, is an antihypotensive or sympathomimetic agent of the amphetamine family that is marketed in certain European countries.

It is a known metabolite of amphetamine in rats.

See also 
 3,4-Dihydroxyamphetamine
 Norfenfluramine
 4-Hydroxyamphetamine
 Metaraminol
 meta-Tyramine

References 

Substituted amphetamines
Phenols
Sympathomimetics
Norepinephrine-dopamine releasing agents